"The Ringer" is a song by American rapper Eminem from his album Kamikaze (2018).<ref>{{Cite web |url=https://www.cbsnews.com/news/kamikaze-new-eminem-album-surprise-venom-movie-single/ |title=Eminem Drops Surprise Album "Kamikaze |last=Park |first=Andrea |date=September 1, 2018 |publisher=CBS News}}</ref> The track's opener, it was not released as a single but debuted in the top 10 in Australia, Canada, Finland, Ireland, New Zealand, Norway, Portugal, Sweden, Switzerland, the UK, and the US. It contains an interpolation from "Ooouuu", written by Matthew Jacobson and Katorah "Young M.A" Marrero, as performed by the latter.

Contents

In the song, Eminem attacks the contemporary hip hop scene, mainly artists who perform mumble rap. A few rappers he calls out on the track are Lil Yachty, Lil Pump, Lil Xan, Machine Gun Kelly, Vince Staples, NF and Iggy Azalea. He also attacks the critics who gave his previous album, Revival, negative reviews. Finally, he sends shots at U.S. president Donald Trump, similar to the presidential critiques on Revival, calling Trump "Agent Orange" and referencing Eminem's freestyle rap "The Storm" from the 2017 BET Awards.

 Secret Service interview 
On the song, Eminem references the U.S. Secret Service visiting him in response to lyrics on Revival'' perceived to be threatening towards Trump. BuzzFeed filed a Freedom of Information Act request with the Secret Service to find out if this was true. In October 2019, the agency revealed to BuzzFeed that, in response to an email from a TMZ employee pressing the Secret Service to investigate Eminem for his "threatening lyrics" about Ivanka Trump (on "Framed"), they had conducted a background check and arranged an interview, in which the interviewers read the verse out loud to Eminem—and he rapped along. The agency subsequently decided against referring the case to a federal prosecutor.

Personnel
 Eminem – lead vocals, production
 Illa da Producer – production
 Luis Resto – keyboards
 Ronny J – production

Charts

Certifications

References

2018 songs
Songs written by Luis Resto (musician)
Songs written by Eminem
Eminem songs
Songs written by Ronny J
Song recordings produced by Ronny J